Rollomonadia is a proposed subphylum of cryptists, including all currently described cryptist species except Palpitomonas bilix.

References

Cryptista
Hacrobia